The 7th Indie Series Awards were held on April 6, 2016 at the El Portal Theater in Los Angeles, with the ceremony hosted by Eric Martsolf and Jen Lilley. Presented by We Love Soaps, the awards recognize independently produced, scripted entertainment created for the web.

Awards
The nominees were announced on February 3, 2016, with Winterthorne receiving a record-tying 13 nominations. The awards were given on April 6, 2016. Winners are listed first and highlighted in boldface:

References

External links
 Indie Series Awards History and Archive of Past Winners

Indie Series Awards
2016 film awards